Hourman (Matthew Tyler) is a fictional character and superhero who was created by Grant Morrison and Howard Porter. Based upon the Golden Age character Rex Tyler, he first appeared in JLA #12 (November 1997).

Fictional character biography

Creation in the 853rd century
The Hourman of the 853rd century is an android (though he describes himself as an "intelligent machine colony") constructed by Tyler Chemorobotics (formerly TylerCo). Although he is an android, he possesses the full range of emotions and human flaws that an ordinary human does. Nonetheless, the technology with which he was constructed is far advanced beyond anything conceivable in the 20th century. Why the android was built is unknown, although it seems likely that he was in fact commissioned by the New God Metron, who sought to make it his replacement and apprentice. Rex Tyler (the original Hourman), who served as the biological template for the android, spent some time in the future and was involved in its construction.

JLA: Rock of Ages
Shortly after its construction, Metron appointed Hourman as his heir and entrusted him with the Worlogog. The Worlogog was an ancient artifact containing a map of space/time from Creation until the End of the Universe in miniature. The Worlogog, in form of a stone, had been lost for centuries on Earth until it was unearthed by a LexCorp requisition team and was dubbed the Philosopher's Stone. Lex Luthor, not fully understanding the stone, used it to manipulate the alien Jemm with his Injustice Gang against the Justice League of America. The Justice League (notably Batman, Martian Manhunter, and Superman) defeated Luthor and as Superman stood ready to destroy the Worlogog, a temporal split was created.

Were Superman to seemingly destroy the stone, the villain Darkseid would be able to conquer and subjugate the Earth. The corrupted Metron of that future traveled back along the timeline to gather a group of Justice Leaguers that would search for the stone so that it would (unknown to them) fall into the hands of Darkseid.

A timeline in which Superman did not destroy the stone, however, did remain, and to counter the corrupted Metron, Hourman himself also traveled back in time, searching out the Leaguers that were searching for the stone. He was able to convince Green Lantern Kyle Rayner of the terrible future that would follow if they found the stone, and he convinced his teammates Aquaman and Flash (Wally West) to try to stop Darkseid. The three heroes ended up in the alternate timeline in which Darkseid had won, and with the help of their surviving teammates, were able to travel back along the timeline themselves and get a telepathic message to the Martian Manhunter, who stopped Superman from destroying the stone.

The Worlogog was handed to the real Metron, who passed it onto Hourman, who thereby outgrew his role as apprentice and became the master of time and Hypertime, while retaining his membership in the Justice Legion A.

DC One Million
Hourman would later be instrumental in the organization of the celebrations for the return of Superman Prime to the 853rd century. Hourman would use the Worlogog to transport the Justice Legion A into the past to meet the original Justice League, and would then send the League into the future to participate in a form of "super-Olympics". It went according to plan, except the inclusion of the old villain Solaris, who placed a virus (dubbed the Hourman Virus) in the android's body that disabled his time-traveling abilities the moment he reached the past. Now the Legion was stranded in the past and the League in the future.

The Hourman Virus spread to the Justice Legion and then to the rest of the world, which affected both humans and machines. The metahuman population became hostile to the Legion as a result, and they also had to deal with Vandal Savage. It turned out that the virus was the core programming of Solaris, and the Legion would have to create a body in the 20th century for Solaris so the virus could be downloaded into the new body. Hourman was paralyzed by self-pity.

Nonetheless, the Hourman Virus was overcome and Hourman could travel back to the future, and as such, he and the Legion could witness the defeat of Solaris by the hands of Superman Prime, Superman M*, and Green Lantern.

During the celebrations, Hourman reached into the past, seconds before Krypton exploded and created a duplicate of the planet in the 853rd century. He then reached back and plucked the population of Krypton from their world in the seconds after the launch of Kal-El's rocket and before Krypton's final destruction. All this created the world of New Krypton where Superman Prime could live amongst other superpowered Kryptonians, including his parents, as a gift from his comrades in the Justice League and Legions.

Joining the League
After the celebrations had finished, Hourman felt inadequate since he had been used so easily by Solaris as the carrier of the Hourman Virus. Deciding that he needed some more personal growth, he travelled back to the 20th century, since there he could truly grow, unlike in the wondrous 853rd century. Thus he arrived at the Justice League Watchtower, where he would serve as a replacement for the Martian Manhunter (who was on a temporary leave of absence). Immediately upon his entrance, he made somewhat of a temporal snafu, by asking if he had arrived before or after the invasion of the 5th dimension.

He arrived at the Justice League Watchtower, having signaled ahead that he was coming. He did not truly fit in with the League, however, and used his time-vision on multiple occasions to skip over conversations he deemed unnecessary. Eventually, a few members of the League decided to call him on it and decided that Batman would be best to talk some sense into Hourman.

Although annoyed by their interference, he explained to Hourman the worth of thinking before acting. Hourman took the advice rather literally and used his time-vision to learn the history of the Justice League through Batman's experiences. From those experiences, Hourman decided that the best person to guide him through his personal growth was the former mascot of the League, and normal human, Snapper Carr.

Solo series
Hourman and the League found Snapper waiting for them in a Happy Harbor café. Thanks to Hourman's unconscious manipulations of time, Snapper had received a premonition and knew that he would need to help him out. Snapper nicknamed the android Matthew Tyler and took him under his wing, and the two hit it off perfectly.

After Hourman met the android Amazo, Hourman was convinced that he was even more of a liability than before. Snapper helped Hourman understand that he was having problems fitting into the normal world because of the power he wielded. He was practically omnipotent and could manipulate time to his wishes, never learning from his mistakes, and that was what was hindering him, not his lack of experience.

Just as impulsively as he had acted before, Hourman concentrated on breaking down the Worlogog, the source of his almost omnipotent power, scattering its components. He still retained the ability to use his time vision and time travel abilities for an hour out of every 24, so that he was truly an Hourman now. He also kept the permanent abilities of Miraclo strength and speed.

That was not the only effect his confrontation with Amazo had on Hourman. He asked himself if Amazo was the first android, and thus the Adam of the androids; were they inherently meant to be evil. To find the answer to his dilemma, Hourman sought out Professor Ivo, the creator of the Amazo android. In his Hour of Power, he learned how Ivo and Professor T.O. Morrow had created the android Tomorrow Woman, who had broken her programming goal of killing the League and instead died as a hero.

He revived her, and for the last fifty minutes of his Hour of Power, she continued that existence, cementing her status as a hero as she saved lives and lived her life to the fullest. She taught Hourman what consequences his actions can have. In that short time, the two formed a connection that ultimately, when Tomorrow Woman disappeared at the end of the hour, left Hourman with a hole in his non-existent heart.

Joining the Society
While fighting alongside the Justice League in the war with the 5th Dimension, Hourman met the Justice Society of America, and thanks to the feelings and memories of the original Hourman that he possessed, he felt a kinship to them. When asked by Jay Garrick, he attended the funeral of Wesley Dodds, the original Sandman. Together with the others present, he was dragged into the battle for the future Doctor Fate. At the end of that adventure, he joined the Justice Society. During this time, he is often simply referred to as "Tyler".

When Hourman met Rick Tyler, son and heir of the original Hourman, they fought. They would eventually make amends when Amazo, disguised as a future version of Hourman, cures Rick of the disease he had contracted thanks to his Miraclo addiction. After spending some more time with the Society, Hourman left to explore the timestream more, but not before giving Rick two gifts: The first of which was a tachyon-filled hourglass that would give Rick the occasional 'vision' of the future that would take place in an hour's time. The second of these was another hour with Rick's father Rex Tyler whom Hourman retrieved from the fight with Extant and relocated to the Timepoint, a recreation of Rex's old lab. Using a special gauntlet, Rick could travel to and from the Timepoint to talk with his father, with time not existing for Rex while Rick was absent. Once an hour had elapsed, Rex would have to leave to fight Extant and meet his pre-ordained death.

He recently returned at the behest of the Society when Rick was stranded in the Timepoint, mortally wounded. Rick was saved, although Rex's hour in the Timepoint was up and now either Rick or Rex was going to die facing Extant. Instead, Matthew gave his life and took their place, impersonating Rex with a hologram, leaving them with the hourglass from his chest to allow them to return home. When Rex told Hourman that he was as alive as any of them despite being an android, Hourman replied that he appreciated that more than Rex could ever know, and asked Rex to give his wife his love before he returned to the battle with Extant. His broken pieces were retrieved by Rex, who attempts to rebuild him.

A short time later, Rip Hunter said during a team-up with the JSA that the android Hourman would be gone "for a relative year", indicating he may return.

The New Golden Age
In "The New Golden Age", the android Hourman is revealed to be the buyer that wanted to purchase the Lost Children from a Time Scavenger called Childminder.

Powers and abilities
Hourman is often simply called an android, but is actually an intelligent machine colony (possibly a form of nanotechnology) created by Tylerco in the far future. If damaged, this colony can effortlessly multiply and repair. His software is encoded with the genetics of Rex Tyler, giving him all of Rex's memories. He originally possessed the Worlogog, which gave him complete control over time. He later gave all but a shard of it up, but not before he absorbed all of Batman's memories of the JLA.

Though not as powerful as he was originally, Tyler still retained super strength, durability, and speed equivalent to a person using Miraclo. He was able to access an "Hour of Power", sixty minutes during which he had power over time. He can do many things with this control: move between picoseconds, travel through time, use his own time vision (which allows him to see a person's past and future as well as age) or make people and things younger, slow a person down until essentially frozen, create tunnels between different time periods, and share power with other individuals (though the amount of time that he provides them power for directly takes away from his sixty minutes). Tyler activates the Hour of Power at will and the hourglass on his chest keeps count of the time. There seems to be some doubt how often he can use his Hour of Power. Like the other Hourmans' use of Miraclo, sometimes Tyler is said to only have one Hour of Power a day, while at other times he simply must wait another hour to recharge before he can reactivate, and it is unclear if he must use the entire Hour at once or if he can spread it out over the course of the day.

Tyler also has a timeship that he can summon from the timestream. It is connected to him and reacts to his thoughts. It normally appears as a Viking-style wooden sailing ship adorned with clocks, but it can change form as Tyler dictates to anything from a simple wooden skiff to a futuristic spaceship and also be used as a weapon, as when Hourman made a large hand out of it to trap Extant. The ship can travel through time, to alternate timelines, or through Hypertime.

References

External links

Characters created by Grant Morrison
Comics characters introduced in 1997
DC Comics robots
DC Comics characters who can teleport
DC Comics characters with superhuman strength
Fictional androids
Fictional characters who can manipulate time
Male characters in comics
Robot superheroes